Kåre Hovda (24 January 1944 – 13 February 1999) was a Norwegian biathlete. At the 1972 Winter Olympics in Sapporo, he finished fourth with the Norwegian relay team. He received a bronze medal in the men's relay at the 1974 Biathlon World Championships, together with his brother Kjell Hovda, Terje Hanssen and Tor Svendsberget.

References

External links

1944 births
1999 deaths
Norwegian male biathletes
Olympic biathletes of Norway
Biathletes at the 1972 Winter Olympics
Biathlon World Championships medalists